The 2009 Women's Hockey Africa Cup of Nations was the fifth edition of the Women's Hockey Africa Cup of Nations, the quadrennial international women's field hockey championship of Africa organised by the African Hockey Federation. It was held alongside the men's tournament in Accra, Ghana from 11 to 16 July 2009.

The winner qualified for the 2010 Women's Hockey World Cup.

Results

Preliminary round

Third place game

Final

Final standings

See also
2009 Men's Hockey Africa Cup of Nations

References

Women's Hockey Africa Cup of Nations
Africa Cup of Nations
Hockey Africa Cup of Nations
Sport in Accra
International field hockey competitions hosted by Ghana
Hockey Africa Cup of Nations
21st century in Accra
Africa Cup of Nations